Adolf Theuer (sometimes given as Teuer) (20 September 1920 in Henneberg-Bolatitz – 23 April 1947 in Opava) was an SS-Unterscharführer at Auschwitz concentration camp. He was executed after the war as a war criminal.

Life
Previously a bricklayer by trade, Theuer's SS career began when he was deployed to Auschwitz in 1940 at the rank of SS-Rottenführer. On 1 August 1941 he was promoted to SS-Unterscharführer. He served as an SDG or Sanitätsdienstgefreiter; a medical orderly as part of the Sanitätswesen, one of the five concentration camp departments involved in running such a facility. He was also a member of the Desinfektionskommando (disinfection squad), the unit of SS medics involved in the mass gassing of prisoners. One of Theuer's responsibilities was inserting the Zyklon B into the gas chamber, a task shared by other SS orderlies such as SS-Unterscharführer Hans Koch and SS-Oberscharführer Josef Klehr. During the Frankfurt Auschwitz Trials, Klehr, the chief of the Desinfektionskommando, testified that Theuer explained to him that he would insert the gas when ordered to do so by the accompanying SS doctor.

SS-Unterscharführer Oswald Kaduk recalled an incident when Theuer, his fellow countryman, was reluctant to insert the gas. Kaduk stated that:

Theuer remained at the camp until its evacuation in January 1945, when he was subsequently deployed in Ohrdruf concentration camp, a subcamp of Buchenwald concentration camp.

Post-war
Although Theuer did not torture prisoners, he was still known in the camp as a butcher. After the war he was put on trial along with Sofie Hanel (SS-Hilfsaufseherin, SS-Aufseherin, SS-Blockfuhrer) in Prague; both were sentenced to death. Theuer was hanged in Opava (Czechoslovakia) on 23 April 1947. Hanel was hanged on
12 January 1948.

References

Bibliography 
Dębski, Jerzy (1995). Death books from Auschwitz: remnants. Volume 1. Auschwitz-Birkenau State Museum 
Frei, Norbert (2000). Darstellungen und Quellen zur Geschichte von Auschwitz. Volume 1. K. G. Saur Verlag. 
Langbein, Hermann (1995). Der Auschwitz-Prozess: eine Dokumentation. Volume 2. Verlag Neue Kritik. 
Piper, Franciszek; Świebocka, Teresa; Czech, Danuta (1996). Auschwitz: Nazi death camp. Auschwitz-Birkenau State Museum. 

1920 births
1947 deaths
Holocaust perpetrators in Poland
Auschwitz concentration camp personnel
Executed German people
Executed Nazi concentration camp personnel
Nazis executed by Czechoslovakia by hanging
SS non-commissioned officers
Buchenwald concentration camp personnel
Silesian-German people
People from Opava District
Nazis convicted of war crimes
Waffen-SS personnel